Radical 206 meaning "sacrificial tripod" or "three-legged cauldron" is 1 of 4 Kangxi radicals (214 radicals total) composed of 13 strokes.

In the Kangxi Dictionary there are 14 characters (out of 49,030) to be found under this radical.

Characters with Radical 206

Literature

External links
Unihan Database - U+9F0E

206